The 1987–88 New York Islanders season was the 16th season for the franchise in the National Hockey League (NHL). The team improved on its performance from the previous season. They finished with 88 points, which turned out to be good enough for first place in a tightly-contested Patrick Division - the Islanders, despite winning the division, finished only seven points ahead of the last place Pittsburgh Penguins. The Islanders were subsequently eliminated in the first round of the Stanley Cup Playoffs by the New Jersey Devils.

As of 2022, this remains the Islanders' most recent division title, the second longest active drought in the NHL.

Off-season
Denis Potvin resigns the team captaincy, before playing his last season. Forward Brent Sutter is named team captain.

Regular season

Final standings

Schedule and results

Playoffs

Patrick Division Semi-finals vs. New Jersey Devils

New Jersey wins series 4-2

Player statistics

Note: Pos = Position; GP = Games played; G = Goals; A = Assists; Pts = Points; +/- = plus/minus; PIM = Penalty minutes; PPG = Power-play goals; SHG = Short-handed goals; GWG = Game-winning goals
      MIN = Minutes played; W = Wins; L = Losses; T = Ties; GA = Goals-against; GAA = Goals-against average; SO = Shutouts; SA = Shots against; SV = Shots saved; SV% = Save percentage;

Awards and records

Transactions

Draft picks
New York's draft picks at the 1987 NHL Entry Draft held at the Joe Louis Arena in Detroit, Michigan.

Farm teams

See also
 1987–88 NHL season

References

External links

New York Islanders seasons
New York Islanders
New York Islanders
New York Islanders
New York Islanders
Patrick Division champion seasons